Alexandre Vardin (born 18 September 1989) is a French footballer who plays as a full back for Sablé.

Life and career
Vardin began his football career at the age of 15 with Caen, courtesy of a youth development partnership in his native Guadeloupe. He went on play regularly for the club's B team. After six years at the club, he moved on to Quevilly, and was a member of their team that eliminated Olympique Marseille and Rennes from the 2011–12 Coupe de France to reach the final, in which they lost 1–0 to Lyon. He spent the 2012–13 season with another third-tier club, Boulogne, and then joined Sedan, newly demoted to the fifth-tier Championnat de France Amateur 2. He won two consecutive promotions with Sedan and played for them in the third tier before moving on in 2016 to Le Mans, where he went one better, winning three consecutive promotions, from fifth tier to second.

He was included in France under-20's 28-man training camp ahead of the 2009 Jeux de la Francophonie, but did not make the cut.

Honours
US Quevilly
 Coupe de France runners-up: 2011–12

References

1993 births
Living people
Guadeloupean footballers
French footballers
Association football defenders
Stade Malherbe Caen players
US Quevilly-Rouen Métropole players
US Boulogne players
CS Sedan Ardennes players
Le Mans FC players
Sablé FC (France) players
Championnat National 2 players
Championnat National players
Championnat National 3 players
Ligue 2 players